The Loganair Westray to Papa Westray route is the shortest scheduled passenger flight in the world. Flights on the route are scheduled for one and a half minutes, and actual flying time is closer to one minute. The record for the fastest flight is 53 seconds. The route is flown by Loganair, a Scottish regional airline that serves Scotland's Highlands and islands. It is also part of a connector flight that links the island of  Westray and the town of Kirkwall, the central and most populous town of the Orkney Islands.

Background
The route between the Orkney Islands of Westray and Papa Westray in northern Scotland is a subsidised public service obligation. The Orkney Islands Council awards the route, along with several other routes throughout the islands, through a tendering process. The flights began in 1967, initially establishing the record for the world's shortest scheduled flights, and they have been continuously operated by Loganair. In 2013, the contract was again awarded to Loganair over two competing bids.

Flights

Flights between Westray Airport and Papa Westray Airport occur daily in both directions, except on Saturdays, when only flights from Westray to Papa Westray are available, and on Sunday, when only flights from Papa Westray to Westray are available. The flights are always combined with flights from and to Kirkwall Airport ( distance), flying in a narrow triangle.

Pilot Stuart Linklater flew the short hop more than 12,000 times, more than any other pilot, before he retired in 2013. Linklater set the record for the fastest flight between the islands at 53 seconds.

Passengers

Many students and their teachers take these flights to study the 60 archaeological sites on Papa Westray, making up the majority of passengers. Occasionally health professionals are needed to assist one of the island's 90 residents, and patients will also take the flight from Papa Westray to medical facilities when needed. The flight has also become popular among tourists.

Aircraft
Loganair operates this flight with one of its two Britten-Norman BN2B-26 Islander aircraft. The Islander is a high-wing, twin piston engine, propeller-driven aircraft. It is flown by a single pilot, and there is seating for eight passengers in the passenger cabin. One additional seat usually remains empty next to the pilot.

Loganair's chief executive, Jim Cameron, described the Islander as "robust" and "well suited to the vagaries of Scottish weather". Summarizing expert opinion of the Islander, Alastair Dalton of The Scotsman said the aircraft "had a good safety record and had proved versatile in operating from the shortest and roughest Highland runways".

Loganair is planning to introduce electric aircraft to the Orkney Islands by 2021 due to the short distance between the islands that would make such flights possible.

Flight numbers
The flight numbers change daily and repeat with a weekly cycle. Loganair Flight 312 departs from Westray Airport to Papa Westray Airport on Monday morning, and Flight 317 returns to Westray that afternoon. On Tuesdays through Fridays, the flight numbers to Papa Westray are 323, 333, 343, and 353. The return flight numbers are 328, 338, 348, and 358. Flight 362 or 363 is the Saturday flight from Westray to Papa Westray, and on Sundays, Flight 378 is the return flight to Westray.

Possible replacement
In 2014 Orkney Islands Council began consultations to build a number of fixed links between seven of the Orkney Islands. This would include a bridge between Westray and Papa Westray. As of 2021 such plans had not begun.

There is a passenger ferry between the islands also, usually 13 daily departures per direction. A car ferry usually runs twice a week.

See also
Flight length
Flight distance record
Bryan Sutherland, engineer

References

Airline routes
Aviation records
Civil aviation
Commercial flights
Westray
Transport in Orkney
Papa Westray